The Croatia national under-16 football team represents Croatia in association football matches for players aged 16 or under.

The team played its first match in a friendly against Slovenia in Brežice, Slovenia in 1993. The team participates in the UEFA Under-16 Development Tournament, being a winner of the 2018 torunament held in Bosnia and Herzegovina.

Recent fixtures

Players

Current squad 

The following players were called up for the tournament against Armenia, Greece and Slovenia, played on 27 and 29 April and 2 May 2022.

See also 

 Croatia national football team
 Croatia national football B team
 Croatia national under-21 football team
 Croatia national under-20 football team
 Croatia national under-19 football team
 Croatia national under-18 football team
 Croatia national under-17 football team
 Croatia national under-15 football team
 Croatia women's national football team
 Croatia women's national under-19 football team
 Croatia women's national under-17 football team

Under 16
European national under-16 association football teams
Youth football in Croatia